Murs 3:16: The 9th Edition is the first collaboration album from California rapper Murs (formerly of Living Legends) and North Carolina producer 9th Wonder (formerly of Little Brother). It was released on Definitive Jux on March 23, 2004.

The title is a reference to Murs' birthday of March 16, as well as 9th Wonder's involvement.

Track listing

Personnel
 Murs – vocals
 9th Wonder – engineering, mixing, production
 Phonte – vocals on "The Animal"
 El-P – executive producer
 ESE – project coordinator
 Ken Heitmueller – mastering
 Dan Monick – photography
 Chris Tyson – engineering

Charts

References

External links
 
 Murs official website
 Definitive Jux official website

2004 albums
Murs (rapper) albums
Definitive Jux albums
Albums produced by 9th Wonder